Algebraic semantics may refer to:
 Algebraic semantics (computer science)
 Algebraic semantics (mathematical logic)